The Guardians is a South Korean television series starring Lee Si-young, Kim Young-kwang, Kim Tae-hoon, Kim Seul-gi and Key. The drama aired on MBC on Mondays and Tuesdays at 22:00 (KST) from May 22 to July 11, 2017.

Synopsis 
Guardians tells the story of a group of four people who team up to serve justice after losing their loved ones to criminals. The group consists of a detective, a prosecutor, a hacker, and an insomniac. They want to give these criminals the punishment that they deserve, and take matters into their own hands as the justice system in South Korea fails to capture the culprits.

Cast

Main 
 Lee Si-young as Jo Soo-ji
 A former shooting player and current detective. She lost her daughter to a murderer and joins the group to punish the criminal who keeps evading the law.
 Kim Young-kwang as Jang Do-han
 A passionate prosecutor who has a story of his own and becomes a monster for revenge.
 Kim Tae-hoon as Kim Eun-jung
Jang Do-han's fellow prosecutor.
 Kim Seul-gi as Seo Bo-mi
A woman who lost her entire family. She communicates with the world through security cameras, and she is a person who avoids social contact.
 Key as Gong Kyung-su
A mischievous skater and a genius hacker whose mother went missing.

Supporting

Seoul Central District Prosecutors' Office 
 Choi Moo-sung as Yoon Seung-ro
 Kim Sang-ho as Oh Kwang-ho
 Park Joo-hyung as Park Joon-pyo

Criminal Investigation Team 
 Kim Sun-young as Lee Sun-ae
 Jung Suk-yong as Nam Byung-jae
 Seo Jae-hyung as Ma Jin-ki

Nearby people 
 Shin Dong-wook as Lee Gwan-woo
 Kim Jung-young as Soo Ji-mo
 Jeon Mi-seon as Park Yoon-hee
 Song Seon-mi as Chae Hye-sun
 Lomon as Yoon Si-wan
 Lee Ji-won as Jin Se-won

Others 
 Ham Na-young as Jo Yoo-na
 Jang Jae-hee
 Seo Jae-hyung
 Choi Soo-hyung as Kim Woo-sung
 Kim Sa-hee as Seung-hee
 Bae Je-ki as Choi Myung-hee
 Yun Da-yeong as Kim Kyung-min
 Kim Dong-joo as Woo-sung' mother
 Ahn Jong-min
 Jung Da-won
 Nam Jung-hee
 Hong Keun-taek
 Suk Bo-bae
 Lee Min-uk
 Kim So-yeon
 Kim Mi-hye
 Jung Young-hoon
 Jung Hyun-suk as doctor
 Son Hyun-joon
 Woo Sang-jun as priest
 Hong Sung-deok as Jang Do-han's father
 Park Sung-gyun
 Jeon Jae-hyung
 Song Seung-yong
 Cho Dong-in as Han Dong-won
 Na Kyung-chul
 Hwang Tae-kwang
 Ha Min
 Shin Yoo-ri
 Lee Seok-ho
 Park Mi-na
 Bong Eun-seon
 Lim Song-ha
 Han Ye-seul
 Kim Young-jin
 Kim Yeon-joo
 Kim Seon-ah
 Jeon Ji-hak
 Kim Joo-hee
 Hyun Seok-joon
 Kang Hyun-uk
 Song Young-jae
 Shin Young-jin
 Nam Tae-boo
 Lim Jae-geun
 Choi Tae-hwan
 Lim Seung-dae as Seo Joo-wan, Seo Bo-mi's uncle (Ep. 12)
 Kim Ki-moo
 Kim Do-yoon as Kang Jin-goo
 Bae Ki-beom
 Song Kyung-hee
 Kim Jin-hee
 Kim Woo-hyun
 Hong Keun-taek
 Ahn Jong-min
 Seo Yoon-ah as Seo Bo-mi's sister
 Ri Min as drunk man in the car
 Park Won-ho
 Kim Sun-hye
 Cha Min-hyuk
 Park Bum-gyu

Special appearance 
 Kim Byung-chun as Seo Bo-mi's father (Ep. 12)
 Jang Hee-soo as Seo Bo-mi's mother (Ep. 12)

Production 
The director Son Hyung-suk is known for his action, thriller drama Two Weeks and his historical drama Shine or Go Crazy.

The series is based on a script by rookie Kim Soo-eun which became the second placer in the 2016 MBC TV Drama Screenplay Competition in Miniseries category, behind Radiant Office which script was written by Jung Hoe-hyun.

"The Guardians" marks Shin Dong-wook's return after being diagnosed with CRPS, a cripplingly painful illness in 2010.

First script reading took place March 29 at MBC Broadcasting Station in Sangam, Seoul, South Korea.

Original soundtracks

Part 1

Part 2

Part 3

Part 4

Part 5

Part 6

Ratings 
In the table below, the blue numbers represent the lowest ratings and the red numbers represent the highest ratings.
NR denotes that the drama did not rank in the top 20 daily programs on that date.

Awards and nominations

International broadcast 
 In Singapore, Malaysia, Indonesia and Hong Kong, the drama started airing on Oh!K starting from May 23, 2017.

Notes

References

External links 
  
 
 

MBC TV television dramas
2017 South Korean television series debuts
Korean-language television shows
South Korean action television series
South Korean thriller television series
2017 South Korean television series endings